This is a list of notable alumni and faculty of Western Kentucky University.

Alumni

Academia
Herman Lee Donovan, former president of Eastern Kentucky University and the University of Kentucky
James R. Ramsey, former president of the University of Louisville.
Michael G. Scales, president of Nyack College and Alliance Theological Seminary
Billy Wilson, president of Oral Roberts University

Business
 Julian Goodman, former president of NBC
 Chester Hurdle, President of the Baltimore Ravens
 Brad Kelley, businessman and (as of 2012) fourth-largest private landowner in the U.S. (attended; never graduated)
 Larry C. Renfro, CEO of Optum and Executive Vice President at UnitedHealth Group

Film and television
Matthew Alan, actor and producer
K.C. Armstrong, former assistant producer of The Howard Stern Show
Emily Althaus, actress (Maureen Kukudio on Orange Is The New Black)
John Carpenter, film director
Clint Ford, voice actor
Charmaine Hunt, one of 18 contestants on the fifth season of NBC's The Apprentice
Matt Long, actor (Jack McCallister on WB's Jack & Bobby)
Charles Napier, actor
Michael Rosenbaum, actor (Lex Luthor on WB's Smallville)
David Schramm, actor (Roy Biggins on NBC's Wings)
 Jonah Scott, actor

History
Lowell H. Harrison, author, WKU university historian

Music
Michael Card, contemporary Christian music artist
Chris Carmichael, arranger, studio multi-instrumentalist
Stephen Cochran, country music singer/songwriter United States Marine and Former face of the US Veterans Affairs (VA) R&D Department (09-14)
Steve Gorman, rock drummer, The Black Crowes
Larnelle Harris, gospel singer
The Hilltoppers, 1950s popular singing group composed of WKU students including Billy Vaughn
Chris Knight, country music singer/songwriter
Bill Lloyd, country/pop/rock musician and composer, half of Foster & Lloyd with Radney Foster
Mark Melloan, singer-songwriter, "High on a Hilltop" writer, and co-writer with Stephen Cochran
 Matthew Shultz, lead singer, guitarist for Cage the Elephant
Tony Smith, singer, guitarist for Sleeper Agent
Nappy Roots, rap group best known for “Good Day”
Tyler Childers, 2019 Grammy nominee, folk country singer

Politics
 Cordell Hull, Secretary of State under FDR, Nobel Peace Prize winner
 Brad Montell, member of Kentucky House of Representatives
 William Natcher, U.S. Representative
 Edwin L. Norris, fifth governor of Montana
Hal Rogers, U.S. Representative from Kentucky
James Comer, U.S. Representative from Kentucky’s 1st District.
Dwight D. Butler, member of the Kentucky House of Representatives

Science
Harry Barkus Gray, chemist
Terrence W. Wilcutt, astronaut  
Farley Norman, psychological scientist

Sports
Darel Carrier, three-time ABA All-Star with the Kentucky Colonels
Steve Crocker, former SCM 50 freestyle world record holder, 1996 WKU Athletic Hall of Fame inductee
Romeo Crennel, Houston Texans Assistant head coach & defense
Claire Donahue, swimmer, gold medalist, 2012 Summer Olympics
Brandon Doughty, former NFL player
Don Durham, former MLB player
Jeremy Evans, NBA player with the Utah Jazz and 2012 slam dunk champion
Tellis Frank, former NBA player with the Miami Heat
Dee Gibson, former BAA and NPBL player
Clem Haskins, former NBA player with Phoenix Suns, former NCAA basketball coach at WKU and the University of Minnesota
Tyler Higbee, current NFL player Los Angeles Rams
Yolanda Hughes-Heying, IFBB professional bodybuilder
Jeremi Johnson, former NFL Player, Cincinnati Bengals
Crystal Kelly, former WNBA player, now women's basketball assistant coach at Bellarmine University
Duane Kuiper, MLB player, now San Francisco Giants broadcaster
Forrest Lamp, NFL player, Los Angeles Chargers
Courtney Lee, NBA player, New York Knicks guard
Virgil Livers, former NFL player, Chicago Bears
Jim McDaniels, former ABA and NBA player
Kenny Perry, professional golfer, PGA Tour and Champions Tour
Bobby Rascoe, former ABA and NBA player
Don Ray, former NBA player
Rod Smart, XFL player known as "He Hate Me"
Greg Smith, former NBA player
Art Spoelstra, former NBA Player
Libby Stout, former NWSL and professional soccer player, now women's soccer assistant coach at Southern Illinois University
Taywan Taylor, NFL player, Cleveland Browns
Chris Turner, former MLB player/catcher for the New York Yankees
Ken Waller, bodybuilder
Jim Weaver, former MLB pitcher
Mike White, NFL player, New York Jets
Bailey Zappe, American football quarterback in the National Football League (NFL).

Other notables
Damon W. Cooper, U.S. Navy Vice Admiral and the first Chief of U.S. Naval Reserve
Larry G. Smith, retired U.S. Army Major General, former Commanding General of the United States Army Security Assistance Command.
Larry Elmore, fantasy artist
Duncan Hines, journalist, namesake of the bakery products company
Mitch McDeere, Fictional protagonist in The Firm by John Grisham
Robert C. Snyder, professor of English at Louisiana Tech University from 1947 to 1989
Ann-Blair Thornton, former Miss Kentucky
Barry A. Vann, author, lecturer
Saeed Jones, Poet, Editor at BuzzFeed
Jack Keane, General, United States Army

Faculty
 David Bell, writer
 Sylvia Kersenbaum, classical pianist
 William L. Lane, New Testament theologian and professor of biblical studies
 Garnie W. McGinty, Louisiana historian
 Thomas Nicholson, drug policy expert

References

Western Kentucky University people
List